Bajo una luna Cámbrica is the first album of Dorso, released in 1989. It is here that the band merges thrash and death while refusing to abandon the progressive side to some compositions.

Track listing
Lyrics by Rodrigo Cuadra.  Music by Yamal Eltit.  Arranged by Dorso.
 Obertura :58
 Cambric Dreams 3:07
 Criptica Visión 3:38
 Vuela en tu Dragón 3:00
 Ciclope 7:23
 Hidra 2:40
 En los alrededores del Templo 4:32
 Suite 1:49
 Vuelo de Terodactilo 2:52
 Expelido del Vientre 5:11

Personnel

Dorso
 Rodrigo Cuadra - vocals, bass, keyboard
 Yamal Eltit - lead and acoustic guitars, backing vocals, drums, percussion, special effects

Additional personnel
 Eduardo Topelberg, Jaime Palma, Juan Coderch, Rafael Alfaro - drums

Dorso albums
1989 albums
Spanish-language albums
Self-released albums